Hypercompe cretacea is a moth of the family Erebidae first described by Paul Dognin in 1912. It is found in Colombia.

References

cretacea
Moths described in 1912